Bridge is a surname. Notable people with the surname include:

Andrew Bridge (basketball) (born 1979), English basketball player
Andrew Bridge (lighting designer)
Basil Bridge (born 1938), English cricketer
Bobbe Bridge, American judge
Burnie Bridge (born 1948), American judge
Candice Bridge, American chemist
Chris Bridge (born 1984), English rugby league player
Duncan Bridge (born 1958), retired English badminton player
Ernie Bridge (1936–2013), Australian politician and singer
Ernie Bridge (footballer), New Zealand soccer player
Frank Bridge (1879–1941), English composer and violist
Frankie Bridge (born 1989), English singer-songwriter
Frederick Bridge (1844–1924), English composer and organist
Graeme Bridge (born 1980), English cricketer
Ian Bridge (born 1959), Canadian soccer player
Jane Bridge (born 1960), English judoka
John Bridge (1915–2006), English naval bomb disposal expert, and writer
Jonathan Bridge (born 1966), English actor
Joseph Cox Bridge (1853–1929), was an English organist and composer
Karen Bridge, English badminton player
Mark Bridge (born 1985), Australian soccer player
Wayne Bridge (born 1980), English footballer

See also
 Bridges (surname)

English-language surnames